Renata Kokowska (born 4 December 1958 in Głubczyn) is a former long-distance runner from Poland, who is a triple winner of the Berlin Marathon: 1988, 1991 and 1993. In 1990 she triumphed in the Amsterdam Marathon. She is a two-time national champion in the women's 5.000 metres.

Achievements
All results regarding marathon, unless stated otherwise

References
 IAAF profile

1958 births
Living people
Polish female long-distance runners
Place of birth missing (living people)
Polish female marathon runners
Berlin Marathon female winners
20th-century Polish women
21st-century Polish women